Jesus Rosario Nalupta Sr. was a Filipino lawyer and politician. He served as Mayor of Batac, Ilocos Norte for five terms.

Early life

He was born on November 8, 1938 at Batac, Ilocos Norte to Mariano Nalupta Sr., who was then the Mayor of Batac, and Trinidad Rosario. His younger brother, Mariano Jr., was a Vice Governor of Ilocos Norte, Congressman and Provincial Board Member of the 2nd District of Ilocos Norte and Municipal Councilor of Batac.

Political career

He became Mayor of Batac in 1988 and served until 1998. In 2001, he defeated his sister-in-law, Elena (wife of his brother, Mariano Jr.), who was the incumbent Mayor that time, to make a comeback and served until 2007. His son, Jeffrey, later succeeded him as Mayor.

After his term as Mayor, he became the Director of the Ilocos Norte Electric Cooperative (INEC) - Batac District.

Personal life

He was married to Daisy Castro - Nalupta. They have 9 children;

 Atty. Jesus "Chito" C. Nalupta Jr. (+), Legal Consultant of the City Government of Batac during the administration of his brother Jeffrey. Director of the Ilocos Norte Electric Cooperative (INEC) - Batac District from 2015 - 2017. He died on October 14, 2017.
 Joseph "Jay" C. Nalupta, former Barangay Chairman of Brgy. 1 - N Ricarte. Married to Eugenia Violeta Daradar - Nalupta, former City Councilor of Batac (2007 - 2016).
 Johann Emmanuel "Jack" C. Nalupta, incumbent Barangay Chairman of Brgy. 3 Cangrunaan and ABC President of Batac.
 Jerome C. Nalupta (+), died as an infant
 Jeffrey Jubal "Jef" C. Nalupta, former Mayor of Batac (2007 - 2016). Now the Vice Mayor since 2016.
 Dr. Jeremiah "Jed" C. Nalupta, a Doctor of Medicine. He is a City Councilor of Batac since 2016.
 James Paul "Goro" C. Nalupta, former Barangay Chairman of Brgy. 1 - N Ricarte and ABC President of Batac. Incumbent Provincial Board Member of the 2nd District of Ilocos Norte. Married to Cecille Albano - Nalupta
 Julius "Julo" C. Nalupta, Businessman. Former Kabataang Barangay (KB) President of Batac.
 Atty. Jason "Jess" C. Nalupta, a Law Graduate of Ateneo Law School.

He has 2 grandchildren who served as SK Federated President of Batac; Justin Lorenz D. Nalupta, served from 2002 to 2007, and Jarius Mark D. Nalupta, served from 2010 to 2013.

Death

Nalupta died of a stroke on the night of March 31, 2013. His wake was held at the Castro - Nalupta Residence in Brgy. 1 - N Ricarte, Batac. His remains were brought to the Batac City Hall, in honor of his five terms as Mayor of Batac, on April 9, 2013.

His funeral was held on April 10, 2013 with a mass at the Immaculate Conception Parish. He is buried alongside his son, Jerome, at the Roman Catholic Cemetery, Batac.

See also

 Batac, Ilocos Norte
 Mariano Nalupta Jr.

|-

|-

|-

1938 births
2013 deaths
People from Batac
Mayors of places in Ilocos Norte